Preston-next-Faversham is an area of the town of Faversham in Kent, England, which in the past was a separate village and parish. It became a civil parish in 1866, but in 1894 was divided into three civil parishes: Preston Within. North Preston Without and South Preston Without. All three civil parishes were absorbed into Faversham in 1935. On Ordnance Survey maps, a south-eastern area of the town is labelled Preston.

The ecclesiastical parish remains. The Grade II* listed parish church of St Catherine is of Norman origin.

References 

Faversham
Former civil parishes in Kent